The Magnetic Prandtl number (Prm) is a dimensionless quantity occurring in magnetohydrodynamics which approximates the ratio of momentum diffusivity (viscosity) and magnetic diffusivity.  It is defined as:

where:
 Rem is the magnetic Reynolds number
 Re is the Reynolds number
 ν is the momentum diffusivity (kinematic viscosity)
 η is the magnetic diffusivity

At the base of the Sun's convection zone the Magnetic Prandtl number is approximately 10−2, and in the interiors of planets and in liquid-metal laboratory dynamos is approximately 10−5.

See also
 Prandtl number

References

Dimensionless numbers of fluid mechanics
Fluid dynamics
Magnetohydrodynamics